was a leading Japanese businessman  and President of the Japanese Federation of Economic Organizations (now the Japan Business Federation) who served as Chairman of the National Board of the Boy Scouts of Japan.

Background
In 1956, in his role as President of the Japanese Federation of Economic Organizations, he presented a request to the Japanese ruling party for the resignation of Japanese Prime Minister Ichirō Hatoyama.

In 1971, Ishizaka was the 65th awardee of the Bronze Wolf, the only distinction of the World Organization of the Scout Movement, awarded by the World Scout Committee for exceptional services to world Scouting. In 1966 he also received the highest distinction of the Scout Association of Japan, the Golden Pheasant Award.

See also

 Keiichi Ishizaka, music executive who is a close relative of Taizō

References

External links
 

Japanese chief executives
People from Saitama Prefecture
1975 deaths
1886 births
Toshiba people
Scouting in Japan
Recipients of the Bronze Wolf Award
Recipients of the Order of the Rising Sun with Paulownia Flowers